Trayan Trayanov (born 3 August 1987) is a Bulgarian football defender who plays for Chernomorets Balchik.

Career

Septemvri Sofia
On 14 June 2017, Trayanov joined Septemvri Sofia following his release from Cherno More. He made his debut for the team on 17 July 2017 in a match against Dunav Ruse where he was sent off in the 63rd minute.

He was released from the team on 21 December 2017.

Honours

Club
Cherno More
 Bulgarian Supercup: 2015

References

External links

1987 births
Living people
People from Vratsa
Bulgarian footballers
First Professional Football League (Bulgaria) players
FC Botev Krivodol players
PFC Vidima-Rakovski Sevlievo players
FC Botev Vratsa players
PFC Svetkavitsa players
Neftochimic Burgas players
PFC Chernomorets Burgas players
FC Lokomotiv 1929 Sofia players
PFC Cherno More Varna players
FC Septemvri Sofia players
FC Chernomorets Balchik players
Association football defenders